Teanum may refer to:
 Teanum Apulum, near modern San Paolo di Civitate, in Apulia, Italy
 Teanum Sicidinum, modern Teano, in Campania, Italy